NGC 4293 is a lenticular galaxy in the northern constellation of Coma Berenices. It was discovered by English astronomer William Herschel on March 14, 1784, who described it as "large, extended, resolvable, 6 or 7′ long". This galaxy is positioned to the north-northwest of the star 11 Comae Berenices and is a member of the Virgo Cluster of galaxies. It is assumed to lie at the same distance as the Virgo Cluster itself: around 54 million light years away.

The morphological classification of NGC 4293 is (R)SB(s)0/a, with the SB0/a indicating this has just distinguishable tightly wound spiral arms with a bar structure at the nucleus. An '(s)' notation means that this galaxy does not have a ring-like structure around the nucleus. Star formation within NGC 4293 is only taking place within a confined region at the center of the galaxy. The outer stellar disk of the galaxy appears disturbed, suggesting some form of gravitational interaction.

This is a common type of active galaxy known as a LINER, which means that the optical spectrum is dominated by emission lines from gases in low energy ionization states. The activity may be the result of a supermassive black hole (SMBH) in the nucleus that is undergoing a low rate of matter accretion. The estimated mass of such an SMBH is  M⊙. Radio emission from thermal activity has been detected from the proximity of this object.

Gallery

References

External links
 

Lenticular galaxies
Coma Berenices
4293
7405
LINER galaxies
Virgo Cluster
039907